Beringen may mean:

Beringen, Belgium, a municipality located in the Belgian province of Limburg.
Beringen, Switzerland, a municipality in the canton of Schaffhausen in Switzerland.
Beringen, Luxembourg, a small town in the commune of Mersch.